The 2019–20 Coupe de France preliminary rounds, Bourgogne-Franche-Comté was the qualifying competition to decide which teams from the leagues of the Bourgogne-Franche-Comté region of France took part in the main competition from the seventh round.

A total of eight teams qualified from the Bourgogne-Franche-Comté preliminary rounds. In 2018–19, none of the qualified teams made it past the eighth round.

Schedule
The first two rounds of qualifying took place on the weekends of 17/18 and 24/25 August 2019. A total of 326 teams from Regional 2 (tier 7) and below were included in the draw, with 30 Regional 2 teams given byes to the second round.

The third round draw was made on 3 September 2019. The 22 teams from Regional 1 (tier 6) and the 11 teams from Championnat National 3 (tier 5) joined at this stage.

The fourth round draw was made on 17 September 2019. The 3 teams from Championnat National 2 (tier 4) joined at this stage.

The fifth round draw was made on 2 October 2019. 16 ties were drawn.

The sixth round draw was made on 16 October 2019. Eight ties were drawn.

First round
These matches were played on 17 and 18 August 2019.

Second round
These matches were played on 24 and 25 August 2019.

Third round
These matches were played on 14 and 15 September 2019.

Fourth round
These matches were played on 28 and 29 September 2019.

Fifth round
These matches were played on 12 and 13 October 2019.

Sixth round
These matches were played on 26 and 27 October 2019.

References

Preliminary rounds